Interlude (Swedish: I dödens väntrum) is a 1946 Swedish drama film directed by Hasse Ekman and starring Viveca Lindfors, Hasse Ekman and Erik 'Bullen' Berglund.

The film's sets were designed by the art director Bibi Lindström.

Cast
 Viveca Lindfors as Vellamo Toivonen
 Hasse Ekman as Vilhelm Canitz
 Erik 'Bullen' Berglund as Dr. Lautensack 
 Stig Järrel as Martin Dahlberg
 Bengt Ekerot as Tjuven
 Ronald De Wolfe as Frank Graham 
 Sven-Bertil Norberg as Defie
 Albert Gaubier as Dansören
 Juanita as Dansösen

References

Bibliography 
 Qvist, Per Olov & von Bagh, Peter. Guide to the Cinema of Sweden and Finland. Greenwood Publishing Group, 2000.

External links 
 

1946 films
Swedish drama films
1946 drama films
1940s Swedish-language films
Films directed by Hasse Ekman
Swedish black-and-white films
1940s Swedish films